Make Haste to Live is a 1954 American film noir thriller film directed by William A. Seiter and starring Dorothy McGuire, Stephen McNally and Mary Murphy. Seiter's last feature directorial effort, the film is an adaptation of the Gordons’ novel of the same name. It was produced and distributed by Republic Pictures.

Plot
Crystal Benson is a single mother living in a small town in New Mexico. One afternoon, her teenage daughter, Randy, mentions running into a man who tells her she reminds him of someone he once knew.

Crystal, already jumpy and unable to sleep, knows that this man is her mobster husband, Steve. She knows that he has recently been paroled from prison after serving 18 years. When she first met Steve, she had been captivated by him but, upon discovering his vicious behavior, including involvement in the murder of a police officer, she took their baby and fled.

Expecting Steve to exact murderous revenge on her, Crystal prepares a tape recording explaining everything about her relationship with the man. She puts aside the recording, and money, for Randy to access after her mother's death.

Steve insinuates himself into their lives; he makes it clear he wants to take Randy away and that he will fulfill his long-held plan to torment, and likely kill, Crystal. She tells everyone he is her brother, with whom she has had a difficult, often estranged history. Randy enjoys having her "uncle" in her life.

Crystal organizes an escape for her daughter and herself; she is, however, seemingly transparent to Steve, and he is always, until the end, on her trail.

Cast

 Dorothy McGuire as Crystal Benson 
 Stephen McNally as Steve
 Mary Murphy as Randy Benson
 Edgar Buchanan as Sheriff 
 John Howard as Josh 
 Ron Hagerthy as Hack
 Pepe Hern as Rodolfo Gonzales
 Eddy Waller as Spud Kelly
 Carolyn Jones as Mary Rose
 Rosa Turich as Juana
 Julian Rivero as Carlos
 Celia Lovsky as Mother
 William Bailey as Ed Jenkins
 Argentina Brunetti as Mrs. Gonzales
 Bob Carney as Round-Faced Man
 Joseph Vitale as Big Man
 Paul Lukather as Deputy 
 Dickie Humphreys as Dancer 
 Norma La Roche as Señorita

Reception
Bosley Crowther of The New York Times wrote, "Warren Duff's screen play is hackneyed and William A. Seiter's direction is dull. No one's performance is exciting. Only Edgar Buchanan as a sheriff seems slightly real."

References

External links
 
 
 

1950s English-language films
1950s thriller drama films
1954 drama films
1954 films
American black-and-white films
American thriller drama films
Film noir
American films about revenge
Films about stalking
Films based on American novels
Films based on thriller novels
Films directed by William A. Seiter
Films scored by Elmer Bernstein
Films set in New Mexico
Films shot in New Mexico
Films with screenplays by the Gordons
Republic Pictures films
1950s American films